There is a small community of Japanese people in Egypt, mainly of expatriates from Japan. According to Japan's Ministry of Foreign affairs, there are about 1,051 Japanese residents in Egypt as of 2009.

Overview
Japanese Rail engineers and experts, who were dispatched by Japan International Cooperation Agency, have been coming to Cairo to provide technical guidance on inspection and repair work at Cairo Metro and Japanese firms "Kinki Sharyo Co." and the "Toshiba Corporation" have been contracted to produce the majority of the rolling stock for the project. There is also a team of Japanese archaeologists working in Egypt for over 40 years. One of their major projects was radar scanning inside and outside the Great Pyramid and they have also conducted important work at Dashur and Abusir.

Following the 2011 Egyptian Revolution, many Japanese nationals in Egypt left the country. About 470 Japanese nationals fled the growing unrest in Cairo on three Japanese government-charted airplanes arranged by the Japanese Foreign Ministry's emergency task force in February 2011. The Japanese government is also scrambling to check the safety of all Japanese nationals living in Egypt in the wake of Egyptian President Hosni Mubarak’s resignation

Education
Japanese schools in Egypt:
 Cairo Japanese School

The Egypt-Japan University of Science and Technology is located in Alexandria.

See also

 Egypt–Japan relations
 Egypt-Japan University of Science and Technology

References

External links
 Cairo Japanese Club (カイロ日本人会) 
 Japan Foundation Cairo Office (国際交流基金カイロ日本文化センター)
 Japan Foundation Cairo Office 
 Japan External Trade Organization (JETRO) Cairo
 Japan External Trade Organization (JETRO) Cairo (Archive)

Asian diaspora in Egypt
Egypt
Japanese
Egypt